Neil Bourguiba (born 10 November 1996) (Arabic:نيل بورقيبه) is a Swedish actor. His mother is Swedish and Tunisian and his father is Tunisian (and one-quarter French). He is the great grandson of the first President of Tunisia,  Habib Bourguiba. Bourguiba is best known for playing Wilhelm Beck in the films about Martin Beck. His paternal great-grandmother, wife of the President, was French.

Filmography
Beck – Hämndens pris (2001)
Beck – Annonsmannen (2002)
Beck – Advokaten (2006)
Beck – Gamen (2007)
Beck – Den svaga länken (2007)
Beck – Det tysta skriket (2007)
Beck – I Guds namn (2007)

External links

Living people
Swedish male actors
Swedish people of Tunisian descent
Swedish people of French descent
1996 births